Irina Petrova (born 26 May 1985) is a Russian race walker.

International competitions

External links 

1985 births
Living people
Russian female racewalkers
21st-century Russian women